Svante Törnvall (10 July 1916 – 1 March 2004) was a Chilean water polo player. He competed in the men's tournament at the 1948 Summer Olympics.

References

1916 births
2004 deaths
Chilean male water polo players
Olympic water polo players of Chile
Water polo players at the 1948 Summer Olympics
People from Coquimbo